Ibrahim Kalaniya (1928-1987) was an Indian politician, a Member of Parliament, representing Gujarat in the Rajya Sabha the upper house of India's Parliament as a member of the Indian National Congress.

References

Rajya Sabha members from Gujarat
Indian National Congress politicians
1928 births
1987 deaths